HD 193721 (HR 7785) is an astrometric binary in the southern circumpolar constellation Octans. It has an apparent magnitude of 5.77, allowing it to be faintly seen with the naked eye. Parallax measurements place the system 760 light years away from the Solar System and it is currently receding with a heliocentric radial velocity .

HD 193721 has a stellar classification of G6/8 II — intermediate between a G6 and 8 bright giant. At present it has 3.49 times the mass of the Sun but has expanded to 24.4 times its girth.

The system has an companion designated CPD −81°900. CPD −81°900 is a foreground object, having a higher parallax and different proper motion.

References

G-type bright giants
Octans
Astrometric binaries
Double stars
193721
PD-81 00901
101427
7785
Octantis, 47